Erich Seckler (born September 26, 1963) is a German former footballer.

Honours
 UEFA Cup winner: 1988.

References

1963 births
Living people
German footballers
Bayer 04 Leverkusen players
Hertha BSC players
Bundesliga players
UEFA Cup winning players
Association football defenders